The Czechs in Israel are people who have immigrated from the Czech lands, mostly from the former Czechoslovakia, as well as their descendants.  Czechs in Israel are predominantly Ashkenazi Jews who made aliyah during the 20th century.

History
In 1968, Israel relaxed immigration for refugees from Soviet-occupied Czechoslovakia, both Jewish and non-Jewish. Interfaith families and couples were granted the same rights and responsibilities as other immigrants.

The Czech-Israeli journalist Ruth Bondy has written a book exploring the lives of Czech-born Jews in Israel. Bondy has written that Czech Jews in Israel have developed a reputation for being "square" and law-abiding.

In the 1940s and 1950s, Jewish immigrants from Czechoslovakia, many of them survivors of The Holocaust, took part in founding twenty communities in Israel.

Notable people
In addition, a considerable number of people of Czech and Slovak origin settled in existing Israeli towns and cities. Israeli people of Czech descent include:

 Yosef Alon
 Edna Arbel
 Tuvia Beeri
 Ruth Bondy
 David Flusser
 Gal Gadot
 Esther Hoffe
 Hezi Leskali
 Gideon Levy
 Leo Perutz
 Avital Ronell

Cuisine
The "Little Prague" restaurant chain in Israel serves traditional Czech cuisine.

See also 
 Czech Republic–Israel relations
 Czech diaspora
 History of the Jews in the Czech Republic
Demography of Israel

References